Windows was a smooth jazz band formed in the early 1980s. The band issued eleven albums over a dozen years. Guided by bassist/vocalist Skipper Wise and his writing partner, keyboardist Ed Cohen, the group played a hybrid of fusion and smooth jazz. Peter White performed regularly on many Windows albums. Wise produced White's his first two albums. Windows' popularity peaked in 1989 with the number one radio album The French Laundry.

History

Windows, an instrumental contemporary jazz group that included Skipper (Bassist), Ed Cohen (keyboard), Dudley Brooks (guitar), Tim Timmermans (drums) and Michael Acosta (saxophone). After sending out demo cassettes to record companies and getting back 24 letters saying "Not interested", they received one from Michael Dion of ITI Records expressing interest, saying "I like what I hear, can we meet". They were signed to the label in 1983. Windows, the self-titled album was released in 1983 on the ITI Records label. It received positive reviews that allowed the group to play locally and create a small following. This local buzz attracted Jim Martone of the new-formed Jazz label Intima/Enigma. Windows was signed in 1984 to Intima/Capitol Records and their second album “Is It Safe” was released soon after.

In the summer of 1987, Windows released third album “Mr. Bongo” and it charted Number Three on the new R&R radio format charts now called N.A.C (New Adult Contemporary).

In 1989, signed to a new recording contract at A&M/Cypress records, Windows released “The French Laundry,” the first album to feature Skipper and, guest vocalist Al Stewart, on vocals on the title track. The album immediately went to Number One on the radio charts and stayed there for six weeks.

In 1990, a new Windows album “Blue September” was released on Cypress/Gold Mountain records. The album peaked at Number Three on the radio charts. This album included Al Stewart, Janis Ian and Skipper singing the three vocal tracks.

In 1992 Ed Cohen left Windows. Skipper reorganized an entirely new Windows lineup which released the Album “From the Asylum” on Blue Orchid/DA Music. The album reached number 14 on the radio charts.

The seventh Windows record "My Red Jacket" released in 1993.

“Live Laundry” was released in late 1994. It was composed of live performances of songs from the French Laundry record and unreleased material from that period.

The ninth Windows album “Apples and Oranges” was released in 1995 on Blue Orchid/DA Music.

“The First Three Years” a double CD, released in 1994, included the best of the first two Window’s albums and ‘Mr. Bongo” in its entirety.

In 1996, Skipper, along with Les Pierce (of Colour Club), released the eleventh and final Windows album, “A Funky Distinction.”

Discography

References

Smooth jazz ensembles
American jazz ensembles from California